The 2021 Sugar Bowl was a college football bowl game played on January 1, 2021, with kickoff at 8:00 p.m. EST (7:00 p.m. local CST). The Sugar Bowl was one of two College Football Playoff semifinal games, it featured two of the four teams selected by the College Football Playoff Selection Committee—Ohio State from the Big Ten and Clemson from the Atlantic Coast Conference (ACC), with the winner advancing to face the winner of the Rose Bowl, Alabama, in the 2021 College Football Playoff National Championship. It was the 87th edition of the Sugar Bowl, and was one of the 2020–21 bowl games concluding the 2020 FBS football season. Sponsored by insurance provider Allstate, the game was officially known as the College Football Playoff Semifinal at the Allstate Sugar Bowl.

The game was carried by ESPN, with its lead college football broadcast team of Chris Fowler on play-by-play and Kirk Herbstreit on color commentary. Three days before the game, Herbstreit announced that he had tested positive for COVID-19 and would work the game from his home.

College Football Playoff

Teams
The 2021 Sugar Bowl was held between the Clemson Tigers of the Atlantic Coast Conference (ACC) and the Ohio State Buckeyes of the Big Ten Conference. The game was a rematch of the 2019 Fiesta Bowl, where Clemson defeated Ohio State to advance to the 2020 National Championship Game. It was the 18th Sugar Bowl featuring a matchup of two teams ranked in the top 5. The teams were announced by College Football Playoff selection committee on December 20, 2020.

Only 3,000 ticketed spectators were permitted because of the coronavirus pandemic. There were 728 tickets for family members of Ohio State players and coaches, 728 tickets for family members of Clemson players and coaches. The remaining 1,544 tickets were for sponsors, business partners, and local Sugar Bowl season ticket holders.

Clemson Tigers 

Clemson entered the game with a record of 10–1 (8–1 ACC) after defeating Notre Dame in the 2020 ACC Championship. Clemson's only loss was to Notre Dame earlier in the season, a double-overtime loss in a game the Tigers played without starting quarterback Trevor Lawrence. Other than Notre Dame, Clemson's only win over a ranked team came against Miami (FL). The Tigers were ranked No. 2 entering the game.

Ohio State Buckeyes 

Ohio State entered the game with a record of 6–0 (5–0 Big Ten) after defeating Northwestern in the 2020 Big Ten Championship. In addition to Northwestern, Ohio State defeated two ranked teams during the season, Penn State and Indiana. The Buckeyes were ranked No. 3 entering the game.

Game summary

Scoring summary

Statistics

Trivia 
This was the first time the Buckeyes beat the Tigers, after four previous attempts.

References

External links
 Game statistics at statbroadcast.com

Sugar Bowl
Sugar Bowl
Sugar Bowl
Clemson Tigers football bowl games
Ohio State Buckeyes football bowl games
Sugar Bowl
Sugar Bowl